The CECAFA Women's Championship, also called Women's Challenge Cup, is an association football tournament for teams from Eastern Africa organized by Council for East and Central Africa Football Associations (CECAFA).

Format

History

The first tournament was played in Zanzibar in 1986 and won by the host team. After that there was no tournament for the next thirty years.
The try for reviving the women's championship in the CECAFA region had been attempted in Zanzibar for October 2007. But the tournament was cancelled and never played. The next edition then was proposed for 2016.

That 2016 edition was hosted by Uganda and played in Jinja. There were no other bids to host the tournament. Tanzania won the championship and also Burundi were playing their first official FIFA recognized games ever.

The 2018 edition was again won by Tanzania.

Results

Participating nations
Legend

 – Champions
 – Runners-up
 – Third place
 – Fourth place
 – Losing semi-finals
QF – Quarter-finals
GS – Group stage

Q — Qualified for upcoming tournament
 – Did not qualify
 ×  – Did not enter
 ×  – Withdrew / Banned / Entry not accepted by FIFA
 — National Team did not exist
 – Hosts

See also
CECAFA Cup

Notes and references

External links
CECAFA website

 
CECAFA competitions